George Hugh Neil Towers  FRSC  (28 September 1923 – 15 November 2004) was Emeritus Professor of Botany at the University of British Columbia, Vancouver, British Columbia, Canada.

He was awarded the Flavelle Medal in 1986 and was cited extensively for his work in  medicinal phytochemistry and ethnopharmacology of medicinal plants.

He was born in Bombay, India and was the eldest son of Lieutenant-Colonel George William Towers D.S.O., O.B.E. (Royal Engineers).

His scientific curiosity was aroused by the vast array of insect, plant and reptile life in the tropical climate of Burma where his mother Kathleen Mary Thompson had been born. His mother's family had lived continuously in Burma since the late 18th century.

During World War II he served with distinction in the Royal Navy aboard Corvettes reaching the rank of Lieutenant.

After obtaining his PhD at Cornell University in 1954, he worked at McGill University and the National Research Council of Canada before being recruited to the University of British Columbia as Head of the Botany Department.

References
Professor George Hugh Neil Towers, Ph.D., F.R.S.C. Botanical Electronic News, 337. Accessed online: 20 February 2010.
Science.ca profile. Accessed online: 20 February 2010.

1923 births
2004 deaths
Scientists from Mumbai
20th-century Canadian botanists
Fellows of the Royal Society of Canada
Academic staff of the University of British Columbia
British people in colonial India
British expatriates in the United States
British emigrants to Canada